"Chains" is the final episode of the BBC sitcom Blackadder II, the second series of Blackadder, which was set in Elizabethan England from 1558 to 1603. Power-mad and self-professed "master of disguise", Prince Ludwig the Indestructible kidnaps Lord Blackadder and Lord Melchett. They escape his clutches but Prince Ludwig infiltrates the palace during a fancy dress ball.

Plot
The episode opens with Melchett informing Queenie that his former tutor's son has been kidnapped and begs for her to pay the hefty ransom. Queenie consults the Lord Blackadder on the matter – he tells her to tell Melchett's tutor's son to get stuffed, stating that only an idiot would be so foolish as to be kidnapped. However, literally seconds later, Blackadder is kidnapped by two Spaniards and held for ransom, followed by Melchett a moment later. They awaken in a damp cell accompanied by a deranged Spanish torturer. Blackadder does not speak Spanish, so he and the torturer engage in a lengthy game of charades to determine the exact insults, threats, and mode of torture (for instance, the Spanish torturer is forced to go through several roles in order to call Blackadder a "bastard son of a bitch", and Blackadder is unable to explain via body language the meaning of "fornicating baboon" due to being locked up in a box covered in spikes).  Prince Ludwig the Indestructible, a German pretender to the throne who mispronounces English words, interrupts just as the torturer is about to get started on Edmund; when Edmund does not recognise him, Ludwig reveals that he was once disguised as Big Sally, a waitress at The Old Pizzle in Dover. Edmund is horrified: he had an affair with Big Sally, unaware that it was Ludwig.

At Ludwig's request, Lord Melchett is dragged in screaming. Melchett does not recognise Ludwig, until Ludwig tells him that he once impersonated Flossie, a sheep at a monastery in Cornwall.  Melchett is also aghast, having unknowingly had a sexual encounter with the madman.

Queenie replies that she has decided to spend the requested ransom money on "a big party". Ludwig agrees to imprison them for life instead of killing them in exchange for information on how to get into the palace during the costume party.  When he leaves, Blackadder and Melchett escape and make their way back to England, arriving just in time for the party. Queenie is dressed as her father Henry VIII, while Baldrick is a pencil case.  Edmund promptly stabs "Nursie", who is revealed to be Prince Ludwig masquerading as Nursie dressed as a cow. Ludwig, however, is still alive and flees, swearing revenge. Blackadder throws a dagger at him stating "you will die and be buried". Everyone asks how Blackadder knew the cow was Ludwig. Blackadder explains that Ludwig was a master of disguise so his costume would always look highly impressive while Nursie – a "sad, insane old woman with an udder fixation" – would be wearing a more ridiculous looking costume filled with udders. Everyone then asks if Blackadder missed them. He tells Percy he wished it was him who was being tortured instead. To Baldrick he says he was not missed at all, and as for the Queen, he states that life without her is like "a broken pencil"; she asks him to explain, and he replies "pointless".

But after the credits, it is shown that Blackadder has been murdered by a surprise attack, along with Baldrick, Percy, Queenie, Melchett and Nursie. Ludwig stands over the corpses disguised as Queenie and holding a blood-soaked dagger. He claims that impersonating Queenie is a role he will enjoy – if he can "just get the voice right."

Cast
 Rowan Atkinson as Lord Edmund Blackadder
 Hugh Laurie as Prince Ludwig the Indestructible
 Stephen Fry as Lord Melchett
 Tim McInnerny as Lord Percy Percy
 Tony Robinson as Baldrick
 Miranda Richardson as Queen Elizabeth I
 Patsy Byrne as Nursie
 Max Harvey as the Torturer
 Mark Arden as the 1st Guard
 Lee Cornes as the 2nd Guard

External links

 
 

Blackadder episodes
1986 British television episodes
Television shows written by Ben Elton
Cultural depictions of Elizabeth I
Television shows written by Richard Curtis